Anderson Ridge is a ridge  long, rising above the middle of the head of Koerwitz Glacier in the Queen Maud Mountains. It was mapped by the United States Geological Survey from ground surveys and from U.S. Navy air photos, 1960–64, and named by the Advisory Committee on Antarctic Names for Arthur J. Anderson, a meteorologist with the South Pole Station winter party, 1960.

References 

Ridges of the Ross Dependency
Amundsen Coast